Itzamnaaj Bahlam III (also styled Itzamnaaj B'alam, Shield Jaguar) (647 - June 15, 742) was a Mayan king of the city of Yaxchilan which is now located in Chiapas, Mexico. He rose to power in October 681 and continued to rule until his death in June 742. Itzamnaaj Bahlam III is best known for the many buildings and stelae he commissioned during his rule, many of which are still found at Yaxchilan today. He was spouse to Lady Ik' Skull who herself ruled for a time.

Family
Itzamnaaj Bʼalam was born in 647 to Lady Pacal and Yaxun Bʼalam III and later had a son named Yaxun Bʼalam IV who ascended to the throne after Itzamnaaj Bʼalam's death.

His grandmother was Lady Xibalba, noblewoman of Yaxchilan.

Early life
Little is known of Itzamnaaj Bʼalam's early life except that when he was eleven years old one of his siblings participated in a war that involved Pacal, the famous king of Palenque.

Accession and reign
Shortly before he became king, Itzamnaaj Bahlam defeated Ah Ahaual (a Mayan noble) in war and took him captive to Yaxchilan. At the age of around 34 on October 23, 681, he became king of Yaxchilan. He was married to his aunt, Lady Xoc, and she held a great amount of power.

One of Itzamnaaj Bahlam's greatest accomplishments was the construction of what is now called Temple 23. At Temple 23, Lady Xook is shown performing a bloodletting ritual for three occasions: Itzamnaaj Bahlam's accession to the throne, the birth of Yaxun Bahlam, and the dedication of Temple 23.

Preparing for an heir
Itzamnaaj Bʼalam had a second wife named Lady Eveningstar of Calakmul with whom he had a son named Yaxun Bʼalam. He chose Yaxun Bʼalam to be his successor despite the fact that Lady Xoc, his other wife, had a strategically important bloodline.

It is believed by Linda Schele and David Freidel that Itzamnaaj Bʼalam had Temple 23 in Yaxchilan constructed to honor Lady Xoc while also gaining public support for his son to become king.

He also married Lady Sak Bʼiyaan, but she was not of so high status as his aunt.

End of the reign
The majority of the buildings constructed during Itzamnaaj Bʼalam's reign occurred in the last third of his life. He was still leading his troops to battle in his eighties.

Itzamnaaj Bʼalam died at the age of around 95.

References

Bibliography
 
 
 

742 deaths
647 births
Rulers of Yaxchilan
Medieval kings